Ekbote is a surname native to Indian state of Maharashtra. They belong to Deshastha Rigvedi Brahmin (DRB) community.

Notable people with the surname include:

Ashwini Ekbote (1972–2016), Indian actress and dancer
Datta Ekbote (c. 1936–2020), Indian activist and politician, former Mayor of Pune
Gopal Rao Ekbote (1912–1994), Indian judge and former Chief Justice of Andhra Pradesh High Court
Milind Ekbote, Indian businessman

References